Newport '63 is a live album by jazz musician John Coltrane recorded at the 1963 Newport Jazz Festival, with one additional track recorded at the Village Vanguard in 1961.

Reception

AllMusic reviewer Scott Yanow awarded the album 4.5 stars and stated that "Coltrane performs what is arguably his greatest version of 'My Favorite Things' along with memorable renditions of 'Impressions' and 'I Want to Talk About You.

Track listing 
All compositions by John Coltrane except as indicated

 "I Want to Talk About You" (Eckstine) – 8:16
 "My Favorite Things" (Hammerstein, Rodgers) – 17:26
 "Impressions" – 15:40 (Edited. There is a 17:20 version released on the album My Favorite Things: Coltrane at Newport)
 "Chasin' Another Trane" – 15:26

Personnel 
 John Coltrane – tenor saxophone (1–4), soprano saxophone (2)
 Eric Dolphy – alto saxophone (4 only)
 McCoy Tyner – piano (1–3)
 Jimmy Garrison – double bass  (1–3)
 Reggie Workman – double bass  (4 only)
 Roy Haynes – drums

References 

John Coltrane live albums
1993 live albums
Impulse! Records live albums
Albums recorded at the Village Vanguard
Albums recorded at the Newport Jazz Festival
1963 in Rhode Island